Amrita Puri is an Indian actress. She made her film debut with the ensemble romantic comedy-drama Aisha (2010), which earned her Filmfare nominations for Best Female Debut and Best Supporting Actress. Puri had her first commercial success three years later with the male buddy film Kai Po Che! (2013).

Career
Puri started her career through writing and doing theatre.

Bollywood debut and other roles (2010–2023) 

Puri made her Bollywood film debut with Rajshree Ojha's Aisha in 2010. The ensemble romantic comedy-drama, co-starring Sonam Kapoor, Abhay Deol, Ira Dubey, Cyrus Sahukar, Anand Tiwari, Arunoday Singh and Lisa Haydon, saw Puri portray Shefali Thakur, a friend of Kapoor's eponymous lead. The film proved to be a semi-hit at the box-office and earned Puri two nominations at the 56th Filmfare Awards – Best Female Debut and Best Supporting Actress.

After the moderate response of Aisha, Puri appeared opposite Kunal Khemu in Vishal Mahadkar's directorial debut—the crime thriller Blood Money (2012)—in which she portrayed the wife of Khemu's character.

Puri next appeared in Abhishek Kapoor's buddy drama Kai Po Che! (2013) alongside Sushant Singh Rajput, Amit Sadh and Rajkummar Rao. An adaptation of the novel The 3 Mistakes of My Life, she was cast as Vidya Bhatt, a district level cricketer's younger sister who falls in love with his best friend.

In 2021, she played the role of Maeher Saluja in the family drama short film Clean which premiered on Amazon Mini and received critical acclaim for her performance.

In 2023, she will be playing Salman Khan's girlfriend in Kisi Ka Bhai Kisi Ki Jaan which is releasing 21st April 2023 and Ranveer Singh's girlfriend in Rocky Aur Rani Ki Prem Kahani which is releasing 28th July 2023 and also she will be seeing Siddharth Anand's action thriller Maut alongside Arjun Kapoor and Manoj Bajpayee which is a under of Yash Raj Films banner and produced by Aditya Chopra.

Television work (2015–2022)

Puri made her television debut with the series Stories by Rabindranath Tagore in 2015 in which she had an episodic role. In 2016, she portrayed the lead role of Harleen Kaur opposite Purab Kohli in the series P.O.W. - Bandi Yuddh Ke that aired on StarPlus and ended in 2017. In 2019, she was a part of two web series – Four More Shots Please! as Kavya Arora and Made In Heaven as Devyani Singh. 

In 2022, she played the lead role of Anju Bhatt in the web series Ranjish Hi Sahi on Voot along with Tahir Raj Bhasin and Amala Paul.

Personal life
She is the daughter of Aditya Puri, MD of HDFC Bank.

Filmography

Films

Web series

Television

Awards and nominations

References

External links

Indian film actresses
Actresses in Hindi cinema
Indian stage actresses
Living people
Year of birth missing (living people)
Actresses from Mumbai
21st-century Indian actresses